Line 17 of the Chengdu Metro is an express metro line in Chengdu. The whole line is 50.945 km. The line uses 8-car Type-A trains operating up to 140 km/h speed powered by 25kV AC overhead lines.

Phase 1 runs from Jinxing Station in Wenjiang District to Jitouqiao Station in Wuhou District. Phase 1 is 26.145 km long with 5.5 km running elevated and 20.6 km running underground. There are 9 stations with 2 elevated stations and 7 underground stations.

Phase 2 extends the line west across central Chengdu to Gaohongcun Station. It is 24.8 km long, all underground with 18 additional stations.

Progress
 On February 23, 2017, Sichuan Development and Reform Commission approved Line 17 Phase 1.
 On February 27, 2017, Line 17 Phase 1 started construction.
 On Nov 11 2017, the first tunnel boring machine started digging section between Jiujiang North and Baifoqiao Stations.
 On March 24, 2019, Line 17 phase 1 elevated section was completed.
 On April 9, 2019, Huangshi－Chengdu Fifth People's Hospital, Mingguang－#1 Vent Tunnel sections are completed.
 On August 5, 2019, main structures of all stations on Line 17 was completed.

 On Jan 7 2020, Line 17 Phase 2's Beimenqiao Station started excavation, marking the start of station construction for Phase 2.
 On March 25, 2020, Line 17 Phase 1 finished track-laying.
 On June 19, 2020, Chengdu Metro started 3-month trial operation for Line 17.
 On June 24, 2020, Construction finished for Wutongmiao Depot (五桐庙停车场) for Line 17.
 On December 18, 2020, Line 17 from Jinxing station to Jitouqiao station was opened.

Operation 
Line 17 Phase 1 and Line 19 Phase 1 will be running in connection as one route.

From 2024 
When Line 17 Phase 2 and Line 19 Phase 2 are finished, the operation plan will be:

Line 17 Section：Jiujiang North － Baifoqiao － Jitouqiao

Line 19 Section：Jinxing － Huangshi － Chengdu Fifth People's Hospital－ Fengxihe － Wenquan Avenue － Mingguang － Jiujiang North

Stations

References

Chengdu Metro lines
Railway lines opened in 2020
2020 establishments in China